Cole Peak is a peak,  high, located  northeast of Mount Doumani at the north side of the Watson Escarpment. It was mapped by the United States Geological Survey from ground surveys and from U.S. Navy air photos, 1960–63, and named by the Advisory Committee on Antarctic Names for Jerry D. Cole, airman with U.S. Navy Squadron VX-6 at McMurdo Sound, 1957 and 1960.

References 

Mountains of Marie Byrd Land